Michele Yvette Abbate (born March 9, 1988) is an American professional racing driver. She competes in the Trans-Am Series' West Coast Championship TA2 class for GRR Racing.

Much of Abbate's career has come in road racing, where she has four championships. She has also raced in the Sports Car Club of America and NASCAR Camping World Truck Series.

Racing career
Abbate's started in hobby kart racing. After getting her first car at the age of 16 in 2004, Abbate competed in local autocross events sanctioned by the Sports Car Club of America. Her first national event came iat Qualcomm Stadium in San Diego in 2007, where she finished on the podium.

In 2008, she moved to time attack competitions and occasionally competed in INEX legends car racing where she developed her road racing experience. In 2011, Abbate became a factory driver for Scion and finished runner-up in the 2011 National Auto Sport Association Time Trial standings, followed by winning the MotoIQ Pacific Tuner Car Championship the next year.

Abbate started competing in the United States Touring Car Championship in 2014 for GRR Racing, a team formed by Abbate and her fiancé Anthony Philleo after she lost her original sponsor. She entered the 2015 SCCA Western Conference Majors Tour after receiving $13,000 in crowdfunding, where she won the championship and became the first female driver to be given the Lindley Bothwell Memorial Cal Club Driver of the Year Award.

In 2017, Abbate raced in the Bathurst 6 Hour, where she finished 49th. The following year, she finished on the GT-1 podium in the SCCA National Championship Runoffs at Sonoma Raceway, the youngest woman to accomplish the feat.

GRR Racing switched to the Trans-Am Series' TA2 class for the 2019 season. In 2020, she finished second in the Trans-Am West Coast Championship with four top-five finishes in five races. At Sonoma, she became the first woman to finish on the podium in a TA2 race after taking third.

In May 2021, Abbate joined On Point Motorsports for her NASCAR Camping World Truck Series debut at Circuit of the Americas; she finished second at the track in the Trans-Am West Coast Championship in 2020.

Personal life
Abbate's older brother Michael competed in karting.

She graduated from the University of Nevada, Las Vegas in 2011 with a bachelor's degree in communications and marketing.

Motorsports career results

NASCAR
(key) (Bold – Pole position awarded by qualifying time. Italics – Pole position earned by points standings or practice time. * – Most laps led.)

Camping World Truck Series

 Season still in progress
 Ineligible for series points

References

External links
 
 

Living people
NASCAR drivers
American female racing drivers
Racing drivers from Las Vegas
Racing drivers from Nevada
Sportspeople from Las Vegas
21st-century American women
1988 births